Allan Brodie  is a British historian and architectural historian. His expertise includes medieval ecclesiastical architecture and the history of tourism in Britain. He studied for his MA at the Courtauld Institute of Art, University of London in 1982, the subject of his dissertation being the chronology of the East End of Rochester Cathedral. Photographs contributed by Allan Brodie to the Courtauld's Conway Library archive are currently being digitised as part of the Courtauld Connects project. In 2021 he completed his  Ph.D. (by published work) at the University of Westminster on The Urban Character of the Early English Seaside Resort 1700–1847. The award was based on a new commentary, seven published papers and two books.

Brodie works for Historic England, where he is an architectural investigator in the Partnerships Team (South West). He researches historical buildings including a Roman fort, medieval churches, castles, Georgian prisons and even an Art Deco airport terminal. Brodie's writing also covers topics related to seaside resorts and ports development, including the Georgian sex life of Scarborough, Liverpool's history of sea bathing and a typology of seaside resorts origins, and the phenomenon of Kent resort towns.

Brodie co-edited the collection Travel and Tourism in Britain 1700–1914 with Susan Barton, which reveals 'a transition from travel as a "difficult, dangerous and expensive, but perhaps exotic" pastime to a somewhat more commonplace one'.

Brodie co-authored the book Weston-super-Mare: The town and its seaside heritage (2019), with Johanna Roethe and Kate Hudson-McAulay. The book was launched at the Blakehay Theatre in 2019 in an event hosted by the chair of Historic England, Sir Laurie Magnus.

Career 
Allan Marshall Brodie was educated at Aboyne Primary School and Aboyne Academy. After a MA (Hons) degree at Aberdeen University, he attended the Courtauld Institute of Art, University of London.

From January 1986 to March 1999 Brodie was Senior Architectural Investigator for the Royal Commission on the Historical Monuments of England.

From 1999  Allan Brodie has served as a Senior Investigator at English Heritage and since 2015 Historic England. Brodie co-authored the Historic England book Defending Scilly, regarding the military defences of the Isles of Scilly and the threat of climate change (2011). He has written, or co-authored, widely on seaside resorts, including works on Margate, Weymouth, Blackpool and Weston-super-Mare. He co-authored a book on  seaside resorts in 2007 and wrote books on The Seafront and Tourism and the Changing Face of the British Isles (2019). In 2021 he published a book on England's Seaside Heritage from the Air.

Professional recognition 
Brodie was elected a Fellow the Society of Antiquaries of London on 7 July 2009. He was elected as a Fellow of the Royal Historical Society in 2020.

Publications

Books 
Brodie, Allan. England's Seaside Heritage from the Air. Liverpool: Liverpool University Press ISBN 9781800859647

Brodie, Allan. Tourism and the Changing Face of the British Isles. Swindon: Historic England, 2019  

Brodie, Allan. The Seafront. Swindon: Historic England, 2018  

Brodie, Allan, Roethe Johanna, Hudson-McAulay Kate. Weston Super-Mare: The Town and its Seaside Heritage. Swindon: Historic England, 2019  

Brodie, Allan & Whitfield, Matthew. Blackpool's Seaside Heritage. Swindon: English Heritage, 2014   

Bowden, Mark & Brodie, Allan. Defending Scilly. Swindon: English Heritage, 2011  

Brodie, Allan; Ellis Colin, Stuart, David & Winter, Gary. Weymouth's Seaside Heritage, Swindon: English Heritage, 2008  

Brodie, Allan & Winter Gary. England's Seaside Resorts. Swindon : English Heritage 2007  

Barker, Nigel; Brodie, Allan; Dermott, Nick; Jessop, Lucy & Winter, Gary. Margate's Seaside Heritage. Swindon: English Heritage, 2007  

Brodie, Allan; Sargent, Andrew & Winter, Gary. Seaside Holidays in the Past: London : English Heritage, 2005. 

Brodie, Allan; Croom, Jane & Davies, James O. English Prisons -an Architectural History, Swindon: English Heritage, 2002  

Brodie, Allan; Croom, Jane & Davies, James O. Behind Bars: The Hidden Architecture of England's Prisons. Swindon:  Royal Commission on Historical Monuments, 27 Jan. 2000

Recent journal articles, chapters and online works 
Brodie, Allan. 'Birmingham Airport's 1939 Terminal and Interwar Air Travel in England' Midland History. 1, (2021), 119-139

Brodie, Allan. 'Arthur's Hall and the inner bailey during the Middle Ages' in Pattison, Paul, Brindle, Steven and Robinson, David M The Great Tower of Dover Castle: History, Architecture and Context. Liverpool: Liverpool University Press 2020 ISBN 9781789622430

Brodie, Allan. 'Ports and the Origins of the Seaside Resort in England' in I Sarma (ed) Resorts - Cultural - Historical Landscape and Cultural Space. Conference papers Jurmula 2017. 2019, 59-87

Brodie, Allan. 'Leisure and Commerce - seafront rivals in England's first seaside resorts' Academica Turistica. Year 12, No. 1, June 2019, 19-28

Brodie, Allan. The Castle or the Green Field: Dilemmas and Solutions in English Prison Planning, 1780–1850. Prison service journal. 246, (2019): 4–9. [London, HMSO]

Brodie, Allan. A Brief History of Prison Closures 1777–2015. Prison service journal. 224, (2016): 48–54, [London, HMSO]

Brodie, Allan. Scotland and Tourism: The Long View, 1700–2015. Journal of tourism history, 9, no. 2–3, (2017): 287–289, [London, HMSO]

Brodie, Allan. and Bowdler, Roger. 'The designation of amusement parks and fairground rides in England' in Jason Wood (ed) The Amusement Park: History, Culture and the Heritage of Pleasure. Oxford: Routledge, (2017), 248-67

Brodie, Allan; Brodie, Mary. Law Courts and Courtrooms 1: The Buildings of the Criminal Law. London: Historic England, (2016) 

Brodie, Allan & Brodie, Mary. Law Courts and Courtrooms 2: Civil and Coroner's Courts: Introductions to Heritage Assets. London: Historic England, 2016 

Brodie, Allan. 'Pourquoi se baigner dans la mer? L'influence des écrivains médicaux sur les origines des stations balnéaires en Angleterre' in Philippe Duhamel, Magali Talandier et Bernard Toulier, Le balnéaire. Rennes: Presses Universitaires de Rennes, (2015), 47-62

Brodie, Allan. 'The Georgian Prison: Inquisitive and Investigative Tourism' Prison Service Journal. 216, November 2014, 44-49

Brodie, Allan.  'The Brown Family Adventure – seaside holidays in Kent in the mid-19th century.' Journal of Tourism History. 5:1, (2013), 1-24

Brodie, Allan. 'Scarborough in the 1730s - Spa, Sea and Sex' in John K. Walton (ed) Mineral Springs Resorts in Global Perspective: Spa Histories. London: Routledge, (2013), 15-43

Brodie, Allan. The Garrison Defences on St Mary's in the Isles of Scilly in the 17th and 18th Centuries. English Heritage Historical Review, v7 n1 (2012): 36–65

Brodie, Allan. 'L'architecturra grandiose delle localita balneari inglesi tra il 1815 e il 1840' in Valentina Orioli (ed) Milano Marittima 100. Paesaggi e architetture per il turismo balneare. Milano-Torino: Pearson Italia (2012), 83-8

Brodie, Allan. 'Liverpool and the origins of the Seaside Resort' The Georgian Group Journal. XX, 2012, 63-76

Brodie, Allan & Higgott, Inner Bailey, Dover Castle, Kent : The Inner Bailey 1200–1800. Historic Buildings Report: Portsmouth. English Heritage (2011) (free PDF) 

Brodie, Allan. Arthur's Hall, Dover Castle, Kent: Analysis of the Building. Historic Buildings Report: Portsmouth. English Heritage, (2011) (free PDF)

Brodie, Allan. 'Abraham Tovey (1687–1759) – matross, master gunner and mastermind of Scilly's defences' The Georgian Group Journal. (2011), XIX, 50-65

Brodie, Allan. Towns of "Health and Mirth' - The First Seaside Resorts 1730–1769' in Peter Borsay and John Walton (eds.), Resorts and Ports: European Seaside Towns since 1700. Bristol: Channel View Publications 2011, 18-32

Brodie, Allan. The Tudor Defences of Scilly. English Heritage Historical Review, v5 n1 (2010): 24-43

Brodie, Allan. 'Les premières stations balnéaires anglaises', in Alain Lottin, Jean-Pierre Poussou, Yves Perret-Gentil, (eds) Les villes balnéaires d'Europe occidentale. Paris : Presses de l'Université de Paris-Sorbonne, 2008, 35-61

Brodie, Allan. 'Holiday Camps in the United  Kingdom' in Smaranda Maria Bica & Valter Balducci (eds) Architecture and Society of the Holiday Camps. History and Perspectives. Timisoara 2008, 83-8

Brodie, Allan. Dai Luoghi di Cura ai "Campi di Vacanza" : l' esperienza della costa inglese, Architetture per le colonie di vacanza.'' Patrocinio Istituto per i Beni Artistici, Culturali e Naturali, Regione Emilia-Romagna ... A cura di Valter Balducci. 37–40, (2005)

References 

Year of birth missing (living people)
Living people
Fellows of the Society of Antiquaries of London
Alumni of the Courtauld Institute of Art
20th-century British historians
Social historians
British architectural historians
21st-century British historians
20th-century English male writers
21st-century English male writers
Historic England
Society of Antiquaries of London